Seun Fakorede (born May 22, 1992) is a Nigerian entrepreneur, speaker and politician. At 27, he became the youngest commissioner in Nigeria's history when he was appointed Commissioner for Youth and Sports in Oyo State in August 2019 to July 2021. Seun was reappointed on October 11, 2021. He is the founder and director of non-profit Home Advantage Africa where he advocates for African patriotism among youths.

Education 
Fakorede attended Government College Apata, Ibadan. In 2016, he graduated with a degree in Civil Engineering from Obafemi Awolowo University, Ile Ife. He is an indigene of Idere area of Ibarapa Central Local Government Area, Oyo State.

Awards 
He won The Future Awards Africa Prize for Governance in 2020.

Fakorede was named a 2022 Politician of Year by One Young World, receiving his award in Manchester, England in September 2022 alongside four other young politicians from around the world.

See also 

 Not Too Young To Run
 Ishaku Elisha Abbo
 Oluwaseyi Makinde

References 

Living people
1992 births
Obafemi Awolowo University alumni
People from Oyo State
Nigerian engineers